Presidential elections were held for the first, and to date only time in Cambodia on 4 June 1972, following the toppling of the monarchy and the declaration of the Khmer Republic in the 1970 coup d'état. The result was a victory for Lon Nol, who won 54.9% of the vote. Voter turnout was 57.6%.

Results

References

Cambodia
President
Presidential elections in Cambodia